Joan Çela (born 6 January 2000) is an Albanian footballer who plays as a winger for Kastrioti Krujë in the Kategoria Superiore.

Career

Partizani Tirana
A graduate of the club's youth academy, Çela made his Albanian Superliga debut on 30 May 2019, coming on as a 34th-minute substitute for Jasir Asani in a 1–1 away draw with Luftëtari.

References

Honours

Club
Partizani Tiranë
 Albanian Superliga: 2018–19

External links

2000 births
Living people
FK Partizani Tirana players
Luftëtari Gjirokastër players
Kategoria Superiore players
Albanian footballers
Association football forwards